James Shorter (June 8, 1938 – June 1, 2000) was an American football defensive back in the National Football League for the Cleveland Browns, Washington Redskins, and the Pittsburgh Steelers.  He played college football at the University of Detroit and was drafted in the fourteenth round of the 1962 NFL Draft.

References

1938 births
2000 deaths
American football defensive backs
Cleveland Browns players
Washington Redskins players
Pittsburgh Steelers players
Detroit Titans football players
Players of American football from Montgomery, Alabama